The Richmond Community Church is a historic church building on Fitzwilliam Road (New Hampshire Route 119) in Richmond, New Hampshire, United States. Built in 1838, it is a distinctive regionally early example of Greek Revival church architecture executed in brick. The church was listed on the National Register of Historic Places in 1983. It is now owned by a Methodist congregation.

Description and history
The Richmond Community Church is located in the village center of Richmond, on the south side of Fitzwilliam Road a short way east of its junction with Alford Road and Old Homestead Highway. It is a single-story brick structure, with a gabled roof and clapboarded gable ends. Its main facade faces north toward the road, and is two bays wide. Each bay is flanked by simple brick pilasters, which also appear at the building corners. The bays each house a building entrance with sidelight windows on the ground floor, and sash windows at the gallery level. A square two-stage wood-frame tower rises above the facade.

The church was built in 1838 by a Unitarian congregation, which sold a half interest in the building to the First Baptist Society before the building was completed. It is the earliest in a series of brick churches built at the time in New Hampshire in the Connecticut River valley region, probably built under the influence of earlier work of Lebanon, New Hampshire native Ammi Burnham Young. It is distinguished from earlier Federal style churches by the pilasters on the corners and on the front facade.

See also
National Register of Historic Places listings in Cheshire County, New Hampshire

References

External links
 Church website

Churches on the National Register of Historic Places in New Hampshire
Churches completed in 1838
19th-century Methodist church buildings in the United States
Churches in Cheshire County, New Hampshire
National Register of Historic Places in Cheshire County, New Hampshire
Richmond, New Hampshire